John Bulbeck (christened 30 December 1818 – 1888) was an English cricketer. Bulbeck's batting style is unknown.

Likely born at Havant, Hampshire, Bulbeck made a single first-class appearance for Hampshire against England in 1842 at Day's Ground, Southampton. In a match which England won by an innings and 5 runs, Bulbeck batted twice opening the innings, being dismissed for a duck in each innings by William Hillyer.

He died at the town of his birth sometime in 1888.

References

External links
John Bulbeck at ESPNcricinfo
John Bulbeck at CricketArchive

1888 deaths
People from Havant
English cricketers
Hampshire cricketers
1818 births